Frederick Willard Zens (June 26, 1920 – March 27, 2013) was an American film producer, director, screenwriter and soundtrack composer who worked on mainly low budget films from the 1960s through the 1980s.

Biography and filmography
Following service as a test pilot in the U.S. Army Air Force in the European Theatre of Operations, the Milwaukee, Wisconsin-born Major Zens earned his master's degree in  film from the University of Southern California (USC).

He made his first film Capture That Capsule in 1961. Zens did not make another film until The Starfighters filmed at George Air Force Base that chronicled the F-104 aircraft with Bob Dornan in the lead role. Zens and Dornan next collaborated on a Vietnam war film To the Shores of Hell made the following year.
In 1967 Zens made The Road to Nashville and Hell on Wheels but made no more films until Hot Summer in Barefoot County (1974) and Trucker's Woman (1975), with his final film, The Fix in 1985.

References

External links

1920 births
2013 deaths
Filmmakers from Milwaukee
USC School of Cinematic Arts alumni
Film directors from Wisconsin
American male screenwriters
Writers from Milwaukee
Screenwriters from Wisconsin
Film producers from Wisconsin